The New York State Association of Independent Schools (NYSAIS) is an association of 201 independent schools and organizations, ranging from nurseries to high schools, in New York State. Founded in 1947, NYSAIS is the second largest state association of independent schools in the United States.  As of July 1, 2019 its member schools enrolled approximately 83,024 students. It was established "to protect independent schools from obstructive legislation and regulation". NYSAIS accredits member schools, provides professional development, and works with community leaders to support the needs and interests of independent schools throughout the state. NYSAIS is a member of the National Association of Independent Schools (NAIS) as well the International Council Advancing Independent School Accreditation (ICAISA).

Mission statement
"The New York State Association of Independent Schools promotes the independence, well-being, and public understanding of, and respect for, New York independent schools and serves as an accrediting body chartered by the New York State Board of Regents."

To accomplish its mission, the New York State Association of Independent Schools:

 "Establishes the criteria which reflect the values and best educational practices for evaluating and accrediting member schools;
 "Promotes professional growth of teachers, administrators, and trustees through workshops, conferences, and exchanges;
 "Informs and counsels the leadership at member schools in matters of legislation and regulation;
 "Facilitates the development of cooperative projects among member schools, and between member schools and public schools;
 "Fosters mutually beneficial relations with the New York State Education Department, the National Association of Independent Schools, other educational associations and the general public;
 "Informs member schools about significant practices and developments in independent education; and
 "Provides such other services as will benefit the member schools and the communities they serve."

Governing body and administration
The New York State Association of Independent Schools is governed by a Board of Trustees which meets on a regular basis, including an annual meeting at Mohonk Mountain House on the second Wednesday of November. In 2020-2021, the President of the NYSAIS Board of Trustees is Jean-Marc Juhel, Headmaster, Buckley Country Day School (https://www.buckleycountryday.com/), Rosyln, NY. Dr. Mark W. Lauria has been Executive Director of NYSAIS since 2009.
 
Past Presidents of NYSAIS include Jane Foley Fried (https://www.brearley.org/), James Dawson (Professional Children's School), Jody Douglass (Buffalo Seminary), Scott Gaynor (Stephen Gaynor School), Stephen Watters (Green Vale School), Stephen M. Clement III (The Browning School), Rick Bryan (Nichols School), Drew Castertano (Millbrook School), Dorothy A. Hutcheson (The Nightingale-Bamford School), Charles Hertrick (Allendale Columbia School), and Archibald A. Smith III (Trinity-Pawling School).

History

Early years and incorporation
On April 17, 1947, Paul D. Shafer, President of the Packer Collegiate Institute in Brooklyn sent out a letter to ten colleagues at other New York independent schools to discuss the founding of an association for New York independent schools. Those who received the letter were;
 Dr. Joseph Allen (Poly Prep Country Day School in Brooklyn)
 Mr. Harold C. Amos (Adelphi Academy in Brooklyn)
 Mr. Philip M. B. Babcock (Nichols School in Buffalo)
 Mr. Charles W. Bradlee (Pebble Hill School in DeWitt)
 Dr. Howard I. Dillingham (The Manlius School in Manlius)
 Dr. Frank Hackett (Riverdale Country School in Riverdale-on-Hudson)
 Mrs. Harold S. Osborne (Spence School in NYC)
 Mr. Wilson Parkhill (Collegiate School in NYC)
 Mr. Morton Snyder (Rye Country Day School in Rye)
 Miss Anne Wellington (Emma Willard School in Troy)
The New York State Association of Independent Schools held its first official meeting on October 8, 1947, at the Albany Academies. At the meeting on October 8, 1947, it was moved by Mr. Bradlee and seconded by Mr. Amos that they "set up the nucleus of a State organization (and) that the name be the New York State Association of Independent Schools (whose) membership...shall be limited to those elementary and secondary schools organized under a State charter as non-profit institutions."

The first Annual Meeting of NYSAIS was held on January 18, 1949, at the Emma Willard School in Troy.  The first officers were Paul Shafer (President), Anne Wellington (Vice-President), and Harry E. P. Meislahn (Secretary-Treasurer). The first guest at a NYSAIS meeting was Dr. Henry V. Gilson, New York's Associate Commissioner of Education.

On October 25, 1968, NYSAIS was incorporated under a provisional charter granted by the New York State Board of Regents. The provisional charter required that NYSAIS draft a constitution and that a Board of Trustees be established. This was accomplished at the 20th Annual Meeting which was held on November 12, 1968, at Schrafft's Motor Inn in Albany. At this meeting, President Walter Clark announced the appointment of the first Executive Director, Appleton A. Mason Jr., who had previously served as the Headmaster of the Lake Forest Country Day School in Lake Forest, Illinois. The first official office for NYSAIS was at Appleton Mason's home in Loudonville, New York.

Executive directors 
 Appleton A. Mason Jr. (1968–76) was the first Executive Director of the New York State Association of Independent Schools. Important issues to NYSAIS and its member schools during this era included accreditation, the relationship of NYSAIS with the New York State Athletic Council, the formation of the Independent Educational Services non-profit organization, financial sustainability, and the relationship between independent schools and government funding. There also was a recognition that NYSAIS and the Catholic Education Association had much in common. Of significance in 1969 was the requirement that elementary schools which apply for membership in NYSAIS must be accredited.
 Stephen Hinrichs (1976–86) served as the second Executive Director. Previously Headmaster at The Harley School in Rochester, Hinrich's appointment was announced by the NYSAIS President Richard Barter at the 28th Annual Meeting which was held at the Hilton Inn in Tarrytown. It was during Stephen Hinrichs' tenure that the NYSAIS Annual Meeting was moved to Mohonk Mountain House with the 30th Annual Meeting on November 2–3, 1978. At this meeting, eighty member schools were in attendance. At the March 1, 1979 Board of Trustees meeting, it was recognized that there was considerable merit in holding a single evaluation for an entire school rather than a NYSAIS evaluation of the elementary school and a Middle States Association evaluation of the secondary level. Throughout Stephen Hinrichs' tenure accreditation and the NYSAIS relationship with the Middle States Association remained an important topic of discussion. During the summer of 1981 the NYSAIS offices were moved to Canandaigua.
 Frederick Calder (1986-2007). Formerly Headmaster of Germantown Friends School, Calder was selected to serve as the NYSAIS Executive Director beginning on July 1, 1986, and served until June 2007. At the Board of Trustees meeting on April 16, 1987, Frederick Calder announced that the NYSAIS office would be moved to the campus of the Emma Willard School in Troy because "this proximity to the Capitol offices made it easier to keep an eye on legislation...(and) also made it easier for the Executive Director to visit more member schools." Under Frederick Calder, NYSAIS continued to monitor legislation, coordinate the annual conference and a variety of developing conferences and workshops, and improve the accreditation process. Additionally, during this era, the NYSAIS fiscal year was moved from August 31 to June 30.  Additionally, it became increasingly important for NYSAIS to strengthen its ties with other nonpublic schools through the New York State Coalition for Nonpublic Education. By 1993, there were 112 schools in NYSAIS which were either already accredited or scheduled for accreditation. In 1993, NYSAIS invited the Heads of School from the Connecticut Association of Independent Schools (CAIS) to participate in the Heads of School Annual Meeting at Mohonk Mountain House. During the mid-1990s the use of volunteers to run committees was institutionalized and in 1996 NYSAIS established its first website which was funded by a matching grant from the E.E. Ford Foundation. In January 2006, Frederick Calder announced his retirement from NYSAIS to be effective on June 30, 2007.
 Elizabeth "Penney" Riegelman (2007–09) was offered the position of Executive Director on June 28, 2006, to begin her tenure on July 1, 2007, and served until June 30, 2009. Penney Riegelman had been the Head of School at the Newark Academy in Livingston, New Jersey. It was under Riegelman's leadership that the NYSAIS Charter was amended to include the accreditation of preschools and the initial work to develop a multi-year strategic plan was undertaken.
 Mark W. Lauria (2009–present). Previously Head of School at Foothill Country Day School in Claremont, California and the President of the Board of Trustees for the California Association of Independent Schools, Lauria was appointed as the fifth NYSAIS Executive Director in 2009. During his tenure, one of the biggest changes has been the growing role of technology in NYSAIS member schools. According to Peters, "truly, 2011 was an exceptional year; so much was accomplished" including a revision of the NYSAIS Manual for Evaluation and Accreditation. In addition, the NYSAIS Board of Trustees, on January 19, 2011, voted to form NYSAIS Operations Inc., which would become its own 501(c)(6) nonprofit organization. This new organization would oversee the NYSAIS Healthcare Consortium as well as the advocacy work done on behalf of the NYSAIS schools. During his tenure, the NYSAIS offices were moved from Schenectady to Albany and annual Regional Meetings were established. The Emerging Leaders Institute (ELI), Division Leaders Institute (DLI), the Justice, Equity and Diversity Institute, Experienced Leaders Advising Schools (ELAS), and NYSAIS-Now were created under his leadership. In 2021, Dr. Lauria was recognized in City and State Magazine on the 2021 Education Power 100 List (City and State Power 100 List)

Membership
NYSAIS has four membership categories:

 Full. An independent nursery/kindergarten, elementary or secondary school incorporated as a 501(c)(3) not-for-profit corporation that has served as a provisional member prior to becoming a full member. Prior to becoming a full member, the school must have been operating as an independent nursery/kindergarten, elementary or secondary school for at least five years, must adhere to NYSAIS criteria of non-discrimination in hiring and admissions, and must be accredited by the NYSAIS Commission on Accreditation.
 Provisional. An independent nursery/kindergarten, elementary or secondary school elected as such by the Board of Trustees and which is incorporated as a 501(c)(3) not-for-profit corporation, and is willing and able to meet the standards for full membership and accreditation within five years of its election as a provisional member. Provisional members must adhere to NYSAIS criteria of non-discrimination in hiring and admissions.
 Associate. An independent educational organization that is not an incorporated not-for-profit (such as a proprietary school) whose standards are neither accredited nor endorsed by NYSAIS, but which is located in the State of New York and is accredited by an accrediting body acceptable to the NYSAIS Trustees.  Associate member schools must adhere to the NYSAIS criteria of non-discrimination in hiring and admissions, and be operated for five consecutive years under the same ownership.
 Association. A nonprofit association concerned with independent school education elected as such by the NYSAIS Board of Trustees. Association members are not entitled to vote and are not provided with legislative services. Association members of NYSAIS include The Parents League of New York, Prep for Prep, Early Steps, Oliver Scholars and Education Collaborative of WNY.

Accreditation

According to the NYSAIS Charter, issued on February 25, 1984, the association has "authority to evaluate and accredit schools in the State of New York (which) is conferred by charter from the Regents of the University of New York." All good schools continually evaluate their performance by means of their own devising, but the view a school takes of itself needs periodically to be supplemented by an external view, one that brings a perspective the school cannot command.

Formal evaluation combines self-scrutiny with external review by a committee of peers, both processes being guided by the NYSAIS Manual for Evaluation and Accreditation. "The Manual gives structure, direction, and scope to the undertaking that goes beyond that which a school might ordinarily elect. The external review brings observations, comments, and suggestions possible only for those who are not immersed in the daily concerns of a school’s life."

The object of evaluation is to assist the school to better realize its objectives, to support rather than to inspect and to enhance the school's unique character rather than to impose a common design. Thus, a school is evaluated in terms of its own purposes and objectives, not those of some remote authority.

The accreditation of the NYSAIS schools is overseen by the NYSAIS Commission on Accreditation, chaired by Bart Baldwin (St. Luke's School). The past chairs were Kate Turley (City and Country School) and William G. Morris Jr. (Friends Academy). The NYSAIS Associate Directors who oversee NYSAIS Accreditation are Shannon Rogers and George Swain.

NYSAIS is a founding member of the International Council Advancing Independent School Accreditation (ICAISA).

Professional Learning 

NYSAIS organizes conferences, workshops, and residential institutes for teachers, school heads, trustees, assistant and division heads, business and financial managers, and administrators. Most of the residential conferences are held at Mohonk Mountain House in New Paltz.

NYSAIS professional learning includes approximately 95 multi-day residential conferences and day-long workshops including the Beginning Teachers Institutes (BTI), Experienced Teachers Institutes (ETI), Emerging Leaders Institutes (ELI), Division Leaders Institute (DLI), the Justice, Equity, and Diversity Institute, as well as topical workshops and conferences for teachers and administrators. Some are collaborative efforts with neighboring state associations of independent schools. NYSAIS professional development provides timely opportunities for education and networking. NYSAIS residential professional learning is directed by Associate Director Dr. Matt Suzuki. The NYSAIS institutes and workshops are directed by Associate Director Marcy Mann.

Experienced Leaders Advising Schools program 
The NYSAIS Experienced Leaders Advising Schools (ELAS) program is a mission-driven initiative established in 2012 to meet a growing need from member schools. ELAS provides high-impact, low-cost advising and mentoring in areas such as governance, leadership, and long-term planning. ELAS advisors (referred to as ELAS Ed-visors) include retired heads of school and senior administrators. ELAS Ed-visors have extensive experience in independent school management and assist NYSAIS schools in finance and investment, fundraising, strategic planning, board structure, governance, succession planning, school leadership, and accreditation. Built upon a solid foundation of best practices combined with current research, each Ed-visement will be custom-designed to meet the specific needs of your educational community. The ELAS program is directed by the NYSAIS Associate Director for Evaluation and Accreditation Shannon Rogers.

Emerging Leaders Institute 
In 2010, participants at the NYSAIS Think Tank identified the need to create a professional development program for emerging leaders in NYSAIS schools. In 2011, NYSAIS launched the NYSAIS Emerging Leaders Institute (ELI) with 16 cohort members. For the sixth cohort group (2021-2023) the program will be directed by Eric Osorio and Jessica Romero. The current cohort includes participants from a diverse range of backgrounds and independent schools across New York State. Admission to the 2-year program is competitive and must include the strong endorsement of one's current Head of School.

Successful completion of this hybrid learning program involves full participation in residential conferences, one-day workshops and online seminars in addition to independent work throughout the two-year cohort experience. Major program components include:

 Three residential Summer Leadership Retreats
 Attendance at the three-day Associate Heads/Division Heads Conference in Year One
 A three-day residential conference of choice in Year Two.

Options include:
 Admissions
 Advancement
 Business Affairs
 Education and Information Technology
 Diversity Practitioners
 Learning and the Brain

In addition to residential conferences, ELI members participate in:
 the NYSAIS Trustee Governance Workshop
 monthly online seminars
 service on a NYSAIS accreditation visiting committee
 a mentor relationship
 an independent leadership project in one's school

Athletic association 
Under the NYSAIS umbrella, the New York State Association of Independent Schools Athletic Association (NYSAISAA) is a sports league for independent schools in New York State. It is overseen by the Athletic Executive Committee (AEC) as well as the NYSAIS Board of Trustees.

References

Bibliography
 Independent by Design: A History of the New York State Association of Independent Schools, Dane L. Peters, 2014
Design for Independence, Inspiration, and Innovation: The New York State Association of Independent Schools at 7 0, Dane L. Peters, 2017

External links 
 

Association of Independent Schools
Private and independent school organizations in the United States
Organizations established in 1947
1947 establishments in New York (state)